Drury Low (born 2 April 1990) is a Cook Islands international rugby league footballer who plays for the Narellan Jets in the Group 6 Rugby League and previously with the Canterbury-Bankstown Bulldogs and Canberra Raiders in the National Rugby League.

Playing career
Low is of Cook Islander descent. Low played his junior rugby league with Altona Roosters & Waverley Oakleigh Panthers, in the Melbourne Rugby League whilst being educated at Bayside Secondary College. 

Low in his late teens was then selected to play for Canberra Raiders where he made his Toyota Cup Debut scoring 2 tries away against Parramatta Eels. In 2009, Low went on to making the Toyota Cup team of the year and win the Toyota Cup Premiership in the inaugural year.

Low made his NRL debut in June 2010 scoring two tries against the New Zealand Warriors. Low played for the Souths Logan Magpies in the 2011 Queensland Cup.

Representative career
In 2010, Low was picked for the Junior Kiwis.

In 2012, Low made his international debut for the Cook Islands in a match against Lebanon.

Low represented the Cook Islands in the 2013 Rugby League World Cup.

On 17 October 2015, Low played for the Cook Islands in their Asia-Pacific Qualifier match against Tonga for the 2017 Rugby League World Cup.

References

External links 
Canterbury Bulldogs profile

1990 births
Living people
Canberra Raiders players
Canterbury-Bankstown Bulldogs players
Cook Islands national rugby league team players
Junior Kiwis players
Mount Pritchard Mounties players
New Zealand rugby league players
New Zealand sportspeople of Cook Island descent
Rugby league centres
Rugby league fullbacks
Rugby league players from Auckland
Rugby league wingers
Souths Logan Magpies players